The Latgalian Farmers Party was a political party in Latvia representing the interests of Latgale farmers during the inter-war period.

History
The party won 17 seats in the 1920 Constitutional Assembly elections, becoming the third-largest party in the Constitutional Assembly. However, the 1922 elections saw the party reduced to just a single seat in the 1st Saeima. It won two seats in the 1925 elections, but did not contest any further elections.

References

Defunct political parties in Latvia
Latgale